Scott Pask is an American scenic and costume designer. He has worked primarily on stage productions in the United States, on Broadway and Off-Broadway, and in regional theatre, as well as in the United Kingdom. He has won Tony Awards for his work on The Pillowman, The Coast of Utopia and The Book of Mormon.

Early life and education
Pask was born and raised in Yuma, Arizona with his twin brother Bruce. Pask earned a Bachelor of Architecture degree from the University of Arizona and a Master of Fine Arts from Yale University. Bruce is a noted stylist and men's fashion director at T: The New York Times Style Magazine.

Career
His Broadway credits include Les Liaisons Dangereuses, Urinetown, The Coast of Utopia, The Vertical Hour, Martin Short: Fame Becomes Me, Kiki and Herb: Alive on Broadway, The Wedding Singer,  La Cage aux Folles, Amour, Sweet Charity, Little Shop of Horrors, Take Me Out, Nine, The Pillowman, and A Steady Rain. He made his Metropolitan Opera debut with his design for Benjamin Britten's Peter Grimes.

Pask designed the original production of The Pillowman and its subsequent UK tour for the National Theatre. Additional credits include On an Average Day (West End) and Tales From Hollywood (Donmar Warehouse) both directed by John Crowley; Bash (Almeida Theatre, New York, Los Angeles, and Showtime); Albert Herring (Opera North U.K); The Underpants, The Bomb-itty of Errors, The Donkey Show (NY, London, Edinburgh, Cambridge), Slanguage, The Gimmick, Love's Fowl, The Beginning of August, Refuge. Also: Baltimore Center Stage, Alliance Theater, South Coast Repertory, Seattle Rep, The Old Globe, ACT, Yale Repertory Theater, Walker Arts Center, Lincoln Center Festival, Spoleto, BAM and Williamstown. He also designed the original scenic design for the debut of Johnny Baseball at the American Repertory Theatre Spring 2010.

Of his work, Ben Brantley in The New York Times wrote: "Scott Pask’s exposed-wall set is the perfect playground for a world in which imagination (aided by chemical substances) provides the décor." in reference to Hair. Pask has said of his work "I do love abstracted places, especially one where I can fill it with so much texture," 

Pask designed the holiday snow globes for Broadway Cares/Equity Fights AIDS for 2005 and 2009.

Productions

Broadway 

 Urinetown – 2001
 Amour – 2002
 Take Me Out – 2003
 Nine – 2003
 Little Shop of Horrors – 2003
 La Cage Aux Follies – 2004
 The Pillowman – 2005
 Sweet Charity – 2005
 The Wedding Singer – 2006
 The Lieutenant of Inishmore – 2006
 Kiki & Herb: Alive on Broadway – 2006
 Martin Short: Fame Becomes Me – 2006
 The Coast of Utopia (Part 1 - Voyage) – 2006
 The Vertical Hour – 2006
 The Coast of Utopia (Part 2 - Shipwreck) – 2006
 The Coast of Utopia (Part 3 - Salvage) – 2007
 The Ritz – 2007
 November – 2008
 Cry-Baby – 2008
 Les Liaisons Dangereuses – 2008
 Speed-the-Plow – 2008
 Pal Joey – 2008
 Impressionism – 2009
 Hair – 2009
 9 to 5 – 2009
 A Steady Rain – 2009
 A Behanding in Spokane – 2010
 Promises, Promises – 2010
 Mrs. Warren's Profession – 2010
 Elling – 2010
 The Book of Mormon – 2011
 The House of Blue Leaves – 2011
 I'll Eat You Last: A Chat With Sue Mengers – 2013
 Pippin – 2013
 Macbeth – 2013
 Casa Valentine – 2014
 It's Only a Play – 2014
 Finding Neverland – 2015
 Something Rotten! – 2015
 Airline Highway – 2015
 The Visit – 2015
 An Act of God – 2015
 Blackbird – 2016
 The Father – 2016
 Waitress – 2016
 Oh, Hello on Broadway – 2016
 The Cherry Orchard – 2016
 The Little Foxes – 2017
 The Band's Visit – 2017
 Mean Girls – 2018
 Saint Joan – 2018
 The Prom (2019)
 Who's Afraid of Virginia Woolf? – TBD
 American Buffalo – TBD

Touring 

 Urinetown (2003-2004)
 Little Shop of Horrors (2004-2006)
 Sweet Charity (2006-2007)
 Hair (2010-2012)
 The Book of Mormon Tours
 Latter Day Tour (2012-2016)
 Jumamosi Tour (2012-2020)
 Pippin (2014-2016)
 Finding Neverland (2016-2018)
 Something Rotten! (2017-2018)
 Waitress (2017-2019) 
 The Band's Visit (2019-present)
 Mean Girls (2019-present)
 The Prom (upcoming)

West End 

 The Playboy of the Western World – 2011
 Amaluna - Cirque Du Soleil – 2017
 Waitress – 2019
 The Book of Mormon – 2021

Off-Broadway 

 Love's Fowl – 1998
 The Mineola Twins – 1999
 The Gimmick – 1999
 The Bomb-itty of Errors – 1999
 Boys Don't Wear Lipstick – 2000
 Urinetown – 2001
 Slanglauge – 2001
 The Underpants – 2002
 Take Me Out – 2002
 Amour – 2002
 The Cherry Orchard – 2005
 The Lieutenant of Inishmore – 2006
 Howard Katz – 2007
 Blackbird – 2007
 Saved – 2008
 Hair – 2008
 Wings – 2010
 Silence! The Musical – 2011
 Tribes – 2012
 First Daughter Suite – 2015
 Incognito – 2016
 Dead Poet's Society – 2016
 The Band's Visit – 2016
 On the Shore of the Wide World – 2017
 Carmen Jones – 2017
 Socrates – 2019

Awards and nominations
Pask won the 1999 Lucille Lortel Award and Henry Hewes Award for his work on The Mineola Twins and the 2001 Bessie Award for Verge.

Tony Awards

Drama Desk Awards

References

External links

Official site

People from Yuma, Arizona
Tony Award winners
Drama Desk Award winners
Yale School of Drama alumni
Living people
Year of birth missing (living people)